Unfinished Business is an album by drummer Eric Carr. It is his second posthumous release, after Rockology.

Track listing

References

2011 albums
Albums published posthumously
Eric Carr albums
Kiss (band)